Sidi Bakhti is a town and commune in Tiaret Province in north-western Algeria.

References

35°14'28"N, 0°58'42"E

Communes of Tiaret Province
Cities in Algeria
Algeria